Shaurya Smarak (Sanskrit : शौर्य स्मारक) is a war memorial situated at Bhopal, inaugurated by the Prime Minister of India Narendra Modi on 14 October 2016. Shaurya Smarak is established by the government of Madhya Pradesh at Bhopal in the heart area of Arera Hills near M.P. Nagar and Secretariat. It is sprawled over a large area of about 12 acres. It is developed as a public park with imaginative and interesting architectural installations depicting the sacrifice of the soldiers. In the park, there is a 62-feet high sculpture rising from the ground called Shaurya Stambh depicting the Indian Army, Navy, and Air Force. The Army is signified by Granite, The Navy in Grey, and the Air Force in White. Around the Shaurya Stambh names of the martyred soldiers have been inscribed on glass boards. Beside the Shaurya Stambh, there is Smarak Jyoti which is lit in holographic flame for the honor of the martyrs. Not only this there is a red sculpture kept in the park which when seen from the main axis it appears as a 'Namaskar' and when looked at from another axis it appears as 'A Drop of Blood'.It is the first war memorial of the country built in the memory of martyrs.

If we move further in the park there is an underground museum having dedicated galleries and landmarks in the memory of war heroes who had shown their gallantry in the various wars with Pakistan and China. It also shows some historical heroes like Maharana Pratap and Tipu Sultan. The galleries portray the original handmade art pieces and portraits of war heroes and displays of different arms. Many displays show the various ranks and badges for different ranks of Army, Navy, and Air force. It is a piece of very good knowledge for a common citizen. Some galleries are also dedicated to award-winning heroes for Paramvir Chakra, Mahavir Chakra, etc. with their short descriptions of heroic acts. The models of various warships, submarines, aircraft are also shown as an educational supplement.  On the outside periphery, various display boards show the proud list of martyrs of various wars of Madhya Pradesh origin along with the national heroes. The main attraction of the museum is a gallery that allows visitors to experience the cold of Siachen Glacier and understand the terrains of the Siachen war zones. Apart from this Shaurya Smarak has an amphitheater and a cafe on-premise. on the occasion, of independence day of India  (Aug 15, 2020) Madhya Pradesh Chef Minister Shivraj Singh Chouhan unveils 37 feet high bronze statue of Bharat Mata
Timings : 12.00PM-7.00PM

Wednesday Closed

Gallery

References

2016 establishments in Madhya Pradesh
Cultural infrastructure completed in 2016
Monuments and memorials in Madhya Pradesh
Buildings and structures in Bhopal
Tourist attractions in Bhopal